HDMS Søormen was a 12-gun cutter of the Royal Dano-Norwegian Navy, built in 1789. After being captured by the British in 1808 she was added to the Royal Navy as HMS Salorman. She was wrecked in 1809.

Construction and design
Søormen was built in Copenhagen to a design by Ernst Stibolt. She was launched on 13 November 1789. The name translate as "The Sea Worm".

Danish service
Søeormen served throughout her nineteen years in the Great Belt off Nyborg, as a guardship in the 1790s and as a tender to the cadet training ship (along with Brevdrageren in 1801 and Fama in 1803) from 1801 to 1803.

Søormen was designated as a mail boat [hence the Danish "kongensbåd" or "kongenjagt" – king’s boat or king’s sloop – in the record], and armed for self-defence. Until August 1808 the Danes considered such vessels non-combatants.  Captain Trampe, in command of a sister ship (Ørnen) in the postal service based in Korsør, was reprimanded for putting his ship in harm's way when he captured a British barge in the Great Belt later that month. However, Frederick VI of Denmark later approved Trampe's action.

In 1807–1809, she was used as a surveying ship.

Capture

When word of the uprising of the Spanish against the French in 1808 reached Denmark, some 12,000 Spanish troops of the Division of the North stationed in Denmark and under the Marquis de la Romana decided that they wished to leave French service and return to Spain. They agreed a plan and on 9 August 1808 the Spaniards seized the fort and town of Nyborg. Keats then prepared to take possession of the port and to organize the departure of the Spanish. Keats informed the Danish authorities that if they did not impede the operation he would spare the town. The Danes agreed, except for the captains of two small Danish warships in the harbour.

The boats captured the brig , of 18 guns and under the command of Otto Frederick Rasch, and the cutter Søormen, of 12 guns and under the command of Thøger Emil Rosenørn. Despite the odds Rasch and Rosenørn decided to resist. British losses were an officer killed and two men wounded; the Danes lost seven men killed and 13 wounded before they struck. In 1847 the Admiralty authorized the issue of the Naval General Service Medal with clasp "11 Aug. Boat Service 1808" to all surviving claimants of the action.

The British organized the evacuation of the Spanish troops using some 50 or so local boats. Some 10,000 troops returned to Spain via Britain.

The British commissioned the cutter under the name Salorman and appointed Lieutenant Andrew Duncan to command her.

Fate
On 22 December 1808, Salorman was part of the escort of the last British convoy of the year leaving the Baltic. She was in company with four other British warships - the frigate , the brig-sloop , the brig-sloop , and the gun-brig  - three Swedish naval vessels and twelve merchant vessels. Unfortunately, the convoy left after an unusually severe winter had set in. Furthermore, a storm coming from the north drove already formed ice onto the convoy.

A storm damaged Salormans yards and rigging and washed one man overboard. Duncan steered her towards Ystad, Sweden, but a blinding snowstorm  developed that obliterated the sight of land. She grounded at about 4 am on 23 December, a little east of Ystad. In the morning boats came out from the town and salvaged what they could. By nightfall it was clear that Salorman was unrecoverable and her crew abandoned her. Next morning she was discovered to be full of water up to her gunwales.

The convoy and its escorts were ill-fated, with Magnet and Fama also being lost, as were most of the merchantmen, many of which the Danes captured or destroyed.

Notes

Citations

Individual record cards in Danish for ships of the Danish Royal Navy can often (but not always) be found at the internet site Orlogmuseet Skibregister. The Danish Naval Museum has a website at which details, drawings and models may be available.  For individual ships already listed, including Søe-Ormen, see here .
References
 
 
Mayo, John Horsley (1897) Medals and decorations of the British Army and Navy. (John Constable).
Ross, Sir John (1838) Memoirs and correspondence of Admiral Lord De Saumarez: From original papers in possession of the family. (R. Bentley)
 
T. A. Topsøe-Jensen og Emil Marquard (1935) "Officerer i den dansk-norske Søetat 1660-1814 og den danske Søetat 1814-1932". (Danish Naval Officers) Two volumes. Download here .

1789 ships
Cutters of the Royal Dano-Norwegian Navy
Ships designed by Ernst Wilhelm Stibolt
Ships built in Copenhagen
Cutters of the Royal Navy
1808 in Denmark
Maritime incidents in 1809
Shipwrecks in the Baltic Sea
Shipwrecks of Sweden